Big Branch is a  long 1st order tributary to Aarons Creek in Mecklenburg County, Virginia.

Course 
Big Branch rises about 1 mile north of Siddon, Virginia, and then flows north-northwest to join Aarons Creek about 1.5 miles northeast of Hitesburg.

Watershed 
Big Branch drains  of area, receives about 44.9 in/year of precipitation, has a wetness index of 430.03, and is about 55% forested.

See also 
 List of Virginia Rivers

References 

Rivers of Virginia
Rivers of Mecklenburg County, Virginia
Tributaries of the Roanoke River